Stoksund is a former municipality in the old Sør-Trøndelag county, Norway. The municipality existed from 1892 until its dissolution in 1964. The  municipality was located in what is now the northwestern part of the municipality of Åfjord in Trøndelag county. The municipality included the island of Stokkøya and the surrounding islets, plus the surrounding area of the mainland. The administrative centre was the village of Revsnes, where the Stoksund Church is located.

Name
The municipal name was spelled Stoksund, with one "k", but today the name of the area is often spelled as "Stokksund". Currently, the official name of the area according to the Norwegian Mapping and Cadastre Authority uses Stokksund, with the letter k used two times. There is no official documentation that exists that shows an official change in the spelling of "Stoksund" to or from "Stokksund".

History

The municipality of Stoksund was established on 1 June 1892 when the old municipality of Bjørnør was divided into three separate municipalities: Stoksund (population: 1,122), Osen (population: 1,575), and Roan (population: 2,069).

During the 1960s, there were many municipal mergers across Norway due to the work of the Schei Committee. On 1 January 1964, the municipality of Stoksund (population: 1,515) was merged into the neighboring municipality of Åfjord (population: 2,643) to its south.

Government
All municipalities in Norway, including Stoksund, are responsible for primary education (through 10th grade), outpatient health services, senior citizen services, unemployment and other social services, zoning, economic development, and municipal roads. The municipality is governed by a municipal council of elected representatives, which in turn elects a mayor.

Municipal council
The municipal council  of Stoksund was made up of 17 representatives that were elected to four year terms. The party breakdown of the final municipal council was as follows:

See also
List of former municipalities of Norway

References

Åfjord
Former municipalities of Norway
1892 establishments in Norway
1964 disestablishments in Norway